The suprarenal veins are two in number:
 the right ends in the inferior vena cava.
 the left ends in the left renal or left inferior phrenic vein.
They receive blood from the adrenal glands and will sometimes form anastomoses with the inferior phrenic veins.

Additional images

References

External links

Veins of the torso
Adrenal gland